Biden v. Sierra Club (previously captioned Trump v. Sierra Club) was a United States Supreme Court case involving the appropriation of funds used to expand the Mexico–United States barrier under the presidency of Donald Trump, colloquially known as the Trump wall. Numerous states and non-governmental organizations filed suit shortly after the order, resulting in a Ninth Circuit ruling that deemed the transfer of funds inappropriate under the Appropriations Clause and leading to the Supreme Court challenge.

Trump's successor, Joe Biden, terminated the national emergency and ceased wall construction, making the case moot. The Supreme Court vacated the ruling and remanded the case to lower courts for any potentially necessary further proceedings.

Background
Portions of the U.S.–Mexico border have had barriers in place to restrict illegal crossings of immigrants from Mexico since 2006, though only about half of the  border is barriered as of 2018. One of Donald Trump's presidential campaign pledges was to greatly expand and fortify the border wall to further restrict illegal immigration into the U.S. Shortly after his inauguration to office in January 2017, Trump issued Executive Order 13767 instructing the government to begin construction of the expanded wall, but as the Order lacked any funding directive, no such construction could begin.

Trump had put pressure on Congress to pass the Build the Wall, Enforce the Law Act of 2018 which would have funded the full costs for construction and ongoing operations, but the bill failed to pass out of the House of Representatives following its change in leadership from Republican to Democratic after the 2018 elections.

While parts of the budget were passed through the year, including the National Defense Authorization Act (NDAA) in August 2019, most other parts of the federal budget remained in limbo as the President and Congress engaged in partisan fighting over the border wall funding. This conflict was a major contributing factor to the 2018–19 government shutdown. While Trump signed the compromised budget and border wall bill to end the shutdown, he then announced his intentions to declare a national emergency as to evoke powers of the National Emergency Act and re-allocate funds to build the border wall.

National Emergency Order and subsequent lawsuits
Trump declared the National Emergency Concerning the Southern Border of the United States on February 15, 2019, two days after signing the 2019 budget into law.

The order was immediately challenged in a number of cases. Two challenges were filed at the United States District Court of the Northern District of California; one led by a group of non-governmental organizations (NGOs) including the Sierra Club and the Southern Border Communities Coalition, represented by the American Civil Liberties Union, and a second by a coalition of 20 states led by California. Judge Haywood Gilliam presided over both cases.

Judge Gilliam issued a preliminary injunction in the Sierra Club case on May 24, 2019, blocking the use of the targeted funds for border wall construction on the basis that the plaintiff's challenge had a good chance of succeeding on the merits. Gilliam asserted that the re-appropriation of funds by Trump violated the separation of powers. Gilliam also stated that Trump's claim of being able to reallocate funds under the National Emergency Act for "unforeseen" events was belied since he had been asking for funding since 2018. Judge Gilliam's injunction was upheld on appeal to the United States Court of Appeals for the Ninth Circuit on July 3, 2019. The administration petitioned the Supreme Court to challenge the injunction, and in a 5–4 ruling issued July 26, 2019, put a stay on the injunction as litigation continued, on the basis that the plaintiffs in the case may not have standing to challenge Trump's order.

The administration appealed both cases to the Ninth Circuit.

The Ninth Circuit on review issued their ruling on both cases on June 26, 2020, finding in a 2–1 ruling in both that the re-appropriation of funds was unconstitutional violating the separation of powers. The Ninth also affirmed that the NGOs had standing in their suit as the ongoing wall construction was impacting the environment of which they had a vested interest in, and thus were damaged by it. As a result, the Sierra Club case plaintiffs petitioned the Supreme Court to reconsider their prior stay based on the findings of the Ninth Circuit in July 2020, but the Court declined to lift the stay in a 5–4 decision issued on July 31, 2020.

Supreme Court
The Trump administration petitioned the Supreme Court challenging the Ninth Circuit decision of both the Sierra Club and the states' case, questing both the standing of the plaintiffs in the original suits, and the authority for the re-allocation of appropriated funds pursuant to Section 8005 of 2019 NDAA was lawful. The Supreme Court granted certiorari for the case on October 19, 2020, anticipating to be heard during the 2020–21 term. 

After the Supreme Court's grant of certiorari, Joe Biden became President of the United States. Biden's early actions in office undid several of Trump's policies, among them those related to illegal immigration. This including formally abandoning the National Emergency that Trump has ordered, with Biden promising not to use any funds to build the wall. Oral arguments for Biden v. Sierra Club had been scheduled to be held in February 2021, but as a result of Biden's revocations, acting Solicitor General Elizabeth Prelogar requested the Supreme Court postpone them, which the Court agreed to.

Subsequently, in orders on July 2, 2021, the Supreme Court granted the government's request to vacate the ruling from the Ninth and remand the case there to determine if any further litigation was required.

References

2020 in United States case law
American Civil Liberties Union litigation
Donald Trump litigation
Immigration to the United States
Sierra Club litigation
Trump administration controversies
United States Supreme Court cases
United States Supreme Court cases of the Roberts Court
Mexico–United States barrier